T. K. Madhava Memorial College is a general degree college located in Nangiarkulangara, Alappuzha district, Kerala. It was established in the year 1964. The college is affiliated with Kerala University. This college offers different courses in arts, commerce and science.

History 

The College is named after T. K. Madhavan, a freedom fighter and social reformer. It was established in 1964 through the combined efforts of Karthikappally, Karunagappally and Mavelikkara SNDP Unions.

Academics 

The college conducts ten degree courses and two postgraduate courses.

Notable alumni 
 Anil Panachooran, Poet, Lyricist, Actor 
 Ashokan (actor), Indian Film Industry
 Sudhesan Midhun, Indian Cricketer

References

External links
 

Sree Narayana College, Kollam
Universities and colleges in Alappuzha district
Educational institutions established in 1964
1964 establishments in Kerala
Arts and Science colleges in Kerala
Colleges affiliated to the University of Kerala